Richard Standish (21 October 1621 – March 1662) was an English politician who sat in the House of Commons  in 1659 and 1660. He was a colonel in the Parliamentarian army in the English Civil War.

Standish was the son of Thomas Standish of Duxbury, the MP for Preston and his wife Anne Wingfield, daughter of Sir Richard Wingfield of Letheringham, Suffolk.

He inherited the Manor of Duxbury and Duxbury Hall after the death of his elder brother Alexander in 1648. In 1654, he was elected Member of Parliament for Lancashire in the First Protectorate Parliament. He was re-elected MP for Lancashire in 1656 for the Second Protectorate Parliament. In 1659 he was elected MP for Preston in the Third Protectorate Parliament. He was re-elected in March 1660 for Preston in the Convention Parliament, but the election was declared void on 20 June.  
 
Standish died at the age of 40. He had married Elizabeth, the daughter of Piers Legh of Lyme, Cheshire, with whom he had six sons and three daughters. His son Richard was created a baronet in 1677.

References

 

1621 births
1662 deaths
People from Chorley
Roundheads
English MPs 1656–1658
English MPs 1659
English MPs 1660
Members of the Parliament of England (pre-1707) for Lancashire